Synagogue is an allegorical mural by John Singer Sargent in the Boston Public Library. It is part of Sargent's larger Triumph of Religion mural cycle in the library's central branch at Copley Square. Synagogue was unveiled in 1919, and it sparked immediate controversy. The cowering and feeble personification of the Synagogue stood in contrast with Sargent's glorified depiction of the Church in the mural cycle, and members of the Jewish community observed that the series delivered an implicit message of Jewish decline and Christian triumph. In November 1919, the rabbi Leo M. Franklin condemned the work in an address: "It is my deep-seated conviction that this presentation of Judaism as a broken faith, as a faith without a future, is untrue to fact and on this ground, rather than in contempt for the mind that conceived it, I maintain that this picture must not find a place in a public institution devoted to the spread of knowledge and to the dissemination of truth." Sargent complained to a friend about the controversy, writing "I am in hot water with the Jews who resent my Synagogue and want to have it removed." Responding to charges that the work was anti-Semitic, the Massachusetts legislature passed a bill ordering the removal of the mural in 1922, but the law was soon repealed, and the work has remained in place.

References 

Paintings by John Singer Sargent
Public art in Boston